Auf dem Damm is  an underground Duisburg Stadtbahn station, located in Duisburg-Meiderich, named after the street "Auf dem Damm", under which it is located. The station was opened in 2000, when the overground tram route from Meiderich to Duissern was replaced by the underground section. The former route was not guided via Auf dem Damm, so before the opening of the new line, this area had no connection to the light rail network. Auf dem Damm station was designed by Eberhard Bosslet.

The station has two tracks sharing an island platform. Like most Duisburg underground stations, the platform is divided into a high part for high-floor light rail vehicles, and a low part for trams with stairs and low-floor entrances.

References

Duisburg Stadtbahn stations
Railway stations in Germany opened in 2000